Gerson Sheotahul (born April 19, 1987) is a Dutch-Curaçaoan football player who currently plays for IJsselmeervogels in the Dutch Topklasse.

Born in Amsterdam, he played with the youth teams of Amsterdam amateur sides RKSV DCG and AFC.  He made his professional debut for FC Volendam and was signed by Willem II Tilburg in 2009.  During the season 2011-12 he was on loan at Telstar. In 2013, he moved to Iraklis Psachna in Greece's Football League.

He is eligible to play for the national teams of Netherlands or Curaçao.

Honours
Volendam
Eerste Divisie: 2007–08

External links
 

1987 births
Living people
Dutch footballers
Association football forwards
FC Volendam players
Willem II (football club) players
Footballers from Amsterdam
AFC Ajax players
SC Telstar players
Eredivisie players
Eerste Divisie players
Derde Divisie players